

1999–2000 season

Schedule and results

2000–01 season

Schedule and results

2001–02 season

Schedule and results

2002–03 season

Schedule and results

2003–04 season

Schedule and results

2004–05 season

Schedule and results

2005–06 season

Schedule and results

2006–07 season

Schedule and results

2007–08 season

Schedule and results

References

2000